In probability theory and information theory, the mutual information (MI) of two random variables is a measure of the mutual dependence between the two variables. More specifically, it quantifies the "amount of information" (in units such as shannons (bits), nats or hartleys) obtained about one random variable by observing the other random variable. The concept of mutual information is intimately linked to that of entropy of a random variable, a fundamental notion in information theory that quantifies the expected "amount of information" held in a random variable.

MI is the expected value of the pointwise mutual information (PMI).

The quantity was defined and analyzed by Claude Shannon in his landmark paper "A Mathematical Theory of Communication", although he did not call it "mutual information". This term was coined later by Robert Fano. Mutual Information is also known as information gain.

Definition 
Let  be a pair of random variables with values over the space .

where  is the Kullback–Leibler divergence.

If the natural logarithm is used, the unit of mutual information is the nat.  If the log base 2 is used, the unit of mutual information is the shannon, also known as the bit.  If the log base 10 is used, the unit of mutual information is the hartley, also known as the ban or the dit.

In terms of PMFs for discrete distributions 

In terms of PDFs for continuous distributions 
In the case of jointly continuous random variables, the double sum is replaced by a double integral:

Motivation 
Intuitively, mutual information measures the information that  and  share: It measures how much knowing one of these variables reduces uncertainty about the other.

Moreover, mutual information is nonnegative (i.e.  see below) and symmetric (i.e.  see below).

Properties

Nonnegativity 
Using Jensen's inequality on the definition of mutual information we can show that  is non-negative, i.e.

Symmetry

The proof is given considering the relationship with entropy, as shown below.

Relation to conditional and joint entropy 
Mutual information can be equivalently expressed as:

Notice the analogy to the union, difference, and intersection of two sets: in this respect, all the formulas given above are apparent from the Venn diagram reported at the beginning of the article.

In terms of a communication channel in which the output  is a noisy version of the input , these relations are summarised in the figure:

Because  is non-negative, consequently, .

The proofs of the other identities above are similar. The proof of the general case (not just discrete) is similar, with integrals replacing sums.

This corroborates the intuitive meaning of mutual information as the amount of information (that is, reduction in uncertainty) that knowing either variable provides about the other.

Note that in the discrete case  and therefore . Thus , and one can formulate the basic principle that a variable contains at least as much information about itself as any other variable can provide.

Relation to Kullback–Leibler divergence 
For jointly discrete or jointly continuous pairs , mutual information is the Kullback–Leibler divergence from the product of the marginal distributions, of the joint distribution , that is,

Furthermore, let  be the conditional mass or density function. Then, we have the identity

The proof for jointly discrete random variables is as follows:

Similarly this identity can be established for jointly continuous random variables.

Note that here the Kullback–Leibler divergence involves integration over the values of the random variable  only, and the expression  still denotes a random variable because  is random.

Bayesian estimation of mutual information 

If samples from a joint distribution are available, a Bayesian approach can be used to estimate the mutual information of that distribution. The first work to do this, which also showed how to do Bayesian estimation of many other information-theoretic properties besides mutual information, was. Subsequent researchers have rederived  and extended 
this analysis. See  for a recent paper based on a prior specifically tailored to estimation of mutual
information per se. Besides, recently an estimation method accounting for continuous and multivariate outputs, was proposed in 
.

Independence assumptions 
The Kullback-Leibler divergence formulation of the mutual information is predicated on that one is interested in comparing  to the fully factorized outer product . In many problems, such as non-negative matrix factorization, one is interested in less extreme factorizations; specifically, one wishes to compare  to a low-rank matrix approximation in some unknown variable ; that is, to what degree one might have
 

Alternately, one might be interested in knowing how much more information  carries over its factorization. In such a case, the excess information that the full distribution  carries over the matrix factorization is given by the Kullback-Leibler divergence

Variations 
Several variations on mutual information have been proposed to suit various needs.  Among these are normalized variants and generalizations to more than two variables.

Metric 
Many applications require a metric, that is, a distance measure between pairs of points. The quantity

satisfies the properties of a metric (triangle inequality, non-negativity, indiscernability and symmetry). This distance metric is also known as the variation of information.

If  are discrete random variables then all the entropy terms are non-negative, so  and one can define a normalized distance

The metric  is a universal metric, in that if any other distance measure places  and  close by, then the  will also judge them close.

Plugging in the definitions shows that

This is known as the Rajski Distance.

Finally,

is also a metric.

Conditional mutual information 

Sometimes it is useful to express the mutual information of two random variables conditioned on a third.

For jointly discrete random variables this takes the form

which can be simplified as

For jointly continuous random variables this takes the form

which can be simplified as

Conditioning on a third random variable may either increase or decrease the mutual information, but it is always true that

for discrete, jointly distributed random variables . This result has been used as a basic building block for proving other inequalities in information theory.

Interaction information 

Several generalizations of mutual information to more than two random variables have been proposed, such as total correlation (or multi-information) and dual total correlation. The expression and study of multivariate higher-degree mutual information was achieved in two seemingly independent works: McGill (1954) who called these functions "interaction information", and Hu Kuo Ting (1962). Interaction information is defined for one variable as follows:

and for 

Some authors reverse the order of the terms on the right-hand side of the preceding equation, which changes the sign when the number of random variables is odd. (And in this case, the single-variable expression becomes the negative of the entropy.) Note that

Multivariate statistical independence 
In this sense, the  can be used as a refined statistical independence criterion.

Applications 
For 3 variables, Brenner et al. applied multivariate mutual information to neural coding and called its negativity "synergy"  and Watkinson et al. applied it to genetic expression. For arbitrary k variables, Tapia et al. applied multivariate mutual information to gene expression. It can be zero, positive, or negative. The positivity corresponds to relations generalizing the pairwise correlations, nullity corresponds to a refined notion of independence, and negativity detects high dimensional "emergent" relations and clusterized datapoints ).

One high-dimensional generalization scheme which maximizes the mutual information between the joint distribution and other target variables is found to be useful in feature selection.

Mutual information is also used in the area of signal processing as a measure of similarity between two signals. For example, FMI metric is an image fusion performance measure that makes use of mutual information in order to measure the amount of information that the fused image contains about the source images. The Matlab code for this metric can be found at. A python package for computing all multivariate mutual informations, conditional mutual information, joint entropies, total correlations, information distance in a dataset of n variables is available.

Directed information 
The term directed information was coined by James Massey and is defined as
.

Note that if , the directed information becomes the mutual information. Directed information has many applications in problems where causality plays an important role, such as capacity of channel with feedback.

Normalized variants 
Normalized variants of the mutual information are provided by the coefficients of constraint, uncertainty coefficient or proficiency:

The two coefficients have a value ranging in [0, 1], but are not necessarily equal. In some cases a symmetric measure may be desired, such as the following redundancy measure:

which attains a minimum of zero when the variables are independent and a maximum value of

when one variable becomes completely redundant with the knowledge of the other.  See also Redundancy (information theory).

Another symmetrical measure is the symmetric uncertainty , given by

which represents the harmonic mean of the two uncertainty coefficients .

If we consider mutual information as a special case of the total correlation or dual total correlation, the normalized version are respectively,
 and 

This normalized version also known as Information Quality Ratio (IQR) which quantifies the amount of information of a variable based on another variable against total uncertainty:

There's a normalization which derives from first thinking of mutual information as an analogue to covariance (thus Shannon entropy is analogous to variance).  Then the normalized mutual information is calculated akin to the Pearson correlation coefficient,

Weighted variants 
In the traditional formulation of the mutual information,

This assumes that all objects or events are equivalent apart from their probability of occurrence. However, in some applications it may be the case that certain objects or events are more significant than others, or that certain patterns of association are more semantically important than others.

For example, the deterministic mapping  may be viewed as stronger than the deterministic mapping , although these relationships would yield the same mutual information.  This is because the mutual information is not sensitive at all to any inherent ordering in the variable values, and is therefore not sensitive at all to the form of the relational mapping between the associated variables.  If it is desired that the former relation—showing agreement on all variable values—be judged stronger than the later relation, then it is possible to use the following weighted mutual information .

which places a weight  on the probability of each variable value co-occurrence, . This allows that certain probabilities may carry more or less significance than others, thereby allowing the quantification of relevant holistic or Prägnanz factors. This weighted mutual information is a form of weighted KL-Divergence, which is known to take negative values for some inputs, and there are examples where the weighted mutual information also takes negative values.

Adjusted mutual information 

A probability distribution can be viewed as a partition of a set.  One may then ask: if a set were partitioned randomly, what would the distribution of probabilities be?  What would the expectation value of the mutual information be? The adjusted mutual information or AMI subtracts the expectation value of the MI, so that the AMI is zero when two different distributions are random, and one when two distributions are identical.  The AMI is defined in analogy to the adjusted Rand index of two different partitions of a set.

Absolute mutual information 
Using the ideas of Kolmogorov complexity, one can consider the mutual information of two sequences independent of any probability distribution:

To establish that this quantity is symmetric up to a logarithmic factor one requires the chain rule for Kolmogorov complexity . Approximations of this quantity via compression can be used to define a distance measure to perform a hierarchical clustering of sequences without having any domain knowledge of the sequences .

Linear correlation 
Unlike correlation coefficients, such as the product moment correlation coefficient, mutual information contains information about all dependence—linear and nonlinear—and not just linear dependence as the correlation coefficient measures.

The equation above can be derived as follows for a bivariate Gaussian:

Therefore,

For discrete data 
Mutual information is one of the measures of association or correlation between the row and column variables.

Other measures of association include Pearson's chi-squared test statistics, G-test statistics, etc.

Applications 
In many applications, one wants to maximize mutual information (thus increasing dependencies), which is often equivalent to minimizing conditional entropy.  Examples include:
 In search engine technology, mutual information between phrases and contexts is used as a feature for k-means clustering to discover semantic clusters (concepts).  For example, the mutual information of a bigram might be calculated as:

 where  is the number of times the bigram xy appears in the corpus,  is the number of times the unigram x appears in the corpus, B is the total number of bigrams, and U is the total number of unigrams.
 In telecommunications, the channel capacity is equal to the mutual information, maximized over all input distributions.
 Discriminative training procedures for hidden Markov models have been proposed based on the maximum mutual information (MMI) criterion.
 RNA secondary structure prediction from a multiple sequence alignment.
 Phylogenetic profiling prediction from pairwise present and disappearance of functionally link genes.
 Mutual information has been used as a criterion for feature selection and feature transformations in machine learning. It can be used to characterize both the relevance and redundancy of variables, such as the minimum redundancy feature selection.
 Mutual information is used in determining the similarity of two different clusterings of a dataset.  As such, it provides some advantages over the traditional Rand index.
 Mutual information of words is often used as a significance function for the computation of collocations in corpus linguistics. This has the added complexity that no word-instance is an instance to two different words; rather, one counts instances where 2 words occur adjacent or in close proximity; this slightly complicates the calculation, since the expected probability of one word occurring within  words of another, goes up with 
 Mutual information is used in medical imaging for image registration. Given a reference image (for example, a brain scan), and a second image which needs to be put into the same coordinate system as the reference image, this image is deformed until the mutual information between it and the reference image is maximized.
 Detection of phase synchronization in time series analysis.
 In the infomax method for neural-net and other machine learning, including the infomax-based Independent component analysis algorithm
 Average mutual information in delay embedding theorem is used for determining the embedding delay parameter.
 Mutual information between genes in expression microarray data is used by the ARACNE algorithm for reconstruction of gene networks.
 In statistical mechanics, Loschmidt's paradox may be expressed in terms of mutual information. Loschmidt noted that it must be impossible to determine a physical law which lacks time reversal symmetry (e.g. the second law of thermodynamics) only from physical laws which have this symmetry. He pointed out that the H-theorem of Boltzmann made the assumption that the velocities of particles in a gas  were permanently uncorrelated, which removed the time symmetry inherent in the H-theorem. It can be shown that if a system is described by a probability density in phase space, then Liouville's theorem implies that the joint information (negative of the joint entropy) of the distribution remains constant in time. The joint information is equal to the mutual information plus the sum of all the marginal information (negative of the marginal entropies) for each particle coordinate. Boltzmann's assumption amounts to ignoring the mutual information in the calculation of entropy, which yields the thermodynamic entropy (divided by the Boltzmann constant).
 The mutual information is used to learn the structure of Bayesian networks/dynamic Bayesian networks, which is thought to explain the causal relationship between random variables, as exemplified by the GlobalMIT toolkit: learning the globally optimal dynamic Bayesian network with the Mutual Information Test criterion.
 The mutual information is used to quantify information transmitted during the updating procedure in the Gibbs sampling algorithm.
 Popular cost function in decision tree learning.
 The mutual information is used in cosmology to test the influence of large-scale environments on galaxy properties in the Galaxy Zoo.
 The mutual information was used in Solar Physics  to derive the solar differential rotation profile, a travel-time deviation map for sunspots, and a time–distance diagram from quiet-Sun measurements
 Used in Invariant Information Clustering to automatically train neural network classifiers and image segmenters given no labelled data.

See also 
 Data differencing
 Pointwise mutual information
 Quantum mutual information
 Specific-information

Notes

References 
 
 
 
 
 
  English translation of original in Uspekhi Matematicheskikh Nauk 12 (1): 3-52.
 
 
 
 David J. C. MacKay. Information Theory, Inference, and Learning Algorithms Cambridge: Cambridge University Press, 2003.  (available free online)
 
 Athanasios Papoulis. Probability, Random Variables, and Stochastic Processes, second edition. New York: McGraw-Hill, 1984. (See Chapter 15.)
 
 
 
 
 

Information theory
Entropy and information